Kennedy Chiduziem Ekezie-Joseph (born 11 June 1998) is a Nigerian entrepreneur and speaker.

Early life and education 
Kennedy was born in Lagos, Nigeria to Joseph and Victoria Ebegbulem. He is from Ehime Mbano Local Government Area of Imo State. He grew up with his parents, and four siblings. While in university, he participated in debate competitions and represented his school nationally. He studied Philosophy, with a concentration in African Philosophy, at the University of Calabar.

In 2014, he founded the Calabar Youth Council for Women’s Rights, a non-profit organization that created awareness and advocated for the rights of Nigerian women in the areas of female genital mutilation, gender-based violence and rape. He was a member of the National Anti-FGM Network, supported by the Girl Generation and the U.K. Department for International Development (DFID). In recognition of his community work, the We Are Family Foundation (WAFF) selected him as a 2017 Global Teen Leader. In 2018, Kennedy was presented with a Queen’s Young Leaders Award by Her Majesty Queen Elizabeth II for his social impact work with Calabar Youth Council for Women’s Rights. He was also recognized by President Obama’s Young African Leaders Initiative (YALI) in 2018. Kennedy was awarded the Yenching Scholarship to attend Peking University in China,where he attained a Master’s degree in Economics & Management and also received the ‘Distinguished Research Award’ in Economics and Management.

Career 
Ekezie is the founder and CEO of Kippa, a Financial services company in Africa. 

 Prior to Kippa, he started his career in Management consulting at Accenture. While he lived in Beijing, he also worked with the team that led the expansion of TikTok into Africa.

In 2022, he won the Future Awards Africa prize for Technology.

Reference 

Living people
1998 births
Nigerian businesspeople
Nigerian business executives